Bîrnova is a village in Ocnița District, Moldova. It has a population of 2432 inhabitants.

References

Villages of Ocnița District